Neil Reidman (born early 1970s) is a British film and television actor.

Biography 

Reidman was born in Birmingham, England. His parents were from Jamaica. At the age of 13 he began attending Birmingham School of Speech and Drama and soon after, he auditioned for the Central Junior Television Workshop. That audition landed him a spot at the Midlands Arts Centre. Later, he trained in method acting at the Rose Bruford College of Speech and Drama in London. His early work included roles in productions of Prince of Morocco, Merchant of Venice, and Pinocchio. He is perhaps best known for his role as Lt. Atillo in the popular BBC TV drama Doctor Who.

Television credits 

Since graduating from Drama school Reidman made his television film debut in 2000  Tough Love, and later that year, he had a recurring role in three episodes of The Bill, where he played the part of Daryl Gilchrist.

2001 saw him in the role of Neil for a single episode of Doctors. Then, for the 2002-03 television season, he appeared in three episodes of Holby City, in the role of DC Windsor.

In 2007, Reidman achieved his most prominent role to date appearing as "Lieutenant Atillo" in Doctor Who.

Other television appearances include EastEnders and roles in Body Story, Casualty, Crimewatch File, Nature Boy, Come Outside (which starred Lynda Baron of Open All Hours), and All About Me with Jasper Carrot. Also 'The Detectorists' (starring Mackenzie Crook of 'Pirates of the Caribbean', the ITV hit Drama 'The Level' and the long running soap 'Emmerdale'. Noticed for his good work Neil was cast as the guest lead in a New years Eve special of the long running medical Drama 'Casualty'. The hour long episode was seen by over four million viewers. In summer 2018 and late 2019, he appeared in episodes of Doctors as his recurring character Simon Shelby the best friend of the regular character Dr Grainger.

Film credits 

In 2007, Reidman appeared in The Birthday Treat and Fast Break. His work in the lead role of Darren in The Birthday Treat brought him the Best Male Actor award at the 9th BFM International Film Festival. The film went on to receive awards for Best Screenplay and Best Film. That same year, Reidman starred in Fast Break (Fierce Productions), which won the First Light Film Awards.

In 2008, he returned to the BFM in Win Lose or Draw with a nomination for Best Actor. Though he did not win that award the picture won Best Film.

Reidman went on to star as Ricky in Sh*t Happens, a motion picture that he wrote and directed himself for FourthWall Productions.
After his role in the film 'Win Lose or Draw' (ODAC productions) he gained his first lead role in a feature 'Hard time Bus'.The film was an instant success and was nominated in festivals worldwide. It won Best film in many International film festivals including the Hollywood Black Film Festival and nominated in six categories in the renowned American Black Film Festival sponsored by (HBO). 'Hard time Bus' completed a tour in cinemas across the UK as well as being screened both in New York and LA. Neil was nominated for Best actor for his portrayal of 'Mark Bishop' at the ABFF in New York. Since then Reidman starred in 'Class 15' , 'Almost saw the Sunshine' and most recently 'IF' a film based on the famous poem by Rudyard Kipling.

Stage 

In 1999, Reidman won the role of Mesrou in The Dispute, a play that was produced by Neil Bartlett at The Other Place in Stratford-Upon-Avon. In 2008, he appeared opposite the singer known as Yaa in the musical The Big Life (directed by Clint Dyer). Uk tour of 'One flew over the cuckoos nest' starring Shane Richie and the late great comedian Felix Dexter. Elephant 21 (Royal Court), 'All babies are the same'(Theatre 503), The Color Purple Musical (Menier chocolate factory) starring Cynthia Enrivo and went on to be transferred to Broadway winning a Tony Award for Best Musical. Neil played the lead in 'Routes' as part of Black History Month (Riverside Theatre Newport/Welsh Millennium centre) and was also screened on 'Made in Cardiff' TV as well as Ignatious Sancho in 'Phyllis in London' at the Greenwich Theatre London. Neil has recently finished playing the manager 'Bill Devaney' in the UK tour of 'The Bodyguard' musical alongside singer Alexandra Burke.

Radio 

 Memory Lane (Dr Who audio release),
 Redeeming History (Radio 3)
 Fruit Salad (BBC Radio 4)
 This Bitter Sweet Earth (BBC Radio 4)
 Trauma (BBC Radio 4)
 The Big Life (BBC Radio 4)
 Shades of Black (BBC Radio 4)
 Hands (BBC Radio 4)
 Top Story (BBC Radio 4)

Related awards 

 First Light Film Awards 2007, Best Drama 2007, for the film Fast Break
 National Television Awards, Best Drama 2007, for the series Dr Who
 Birmingham International Film Festival, Best Drama Documentary 2007, 'Win Lose or Draw'
 9th BFM International Film Festival, Best Screenplay, 2007, 'Birthday Treat'
 10th BFM International Film Festival, Best Film, 2008, 'Win Lose or Draw'
 10th BFM International Film Festival, Best Actor nominee, 'Win Lose or Draw'
 8th Annual Music Video and Screen Awards, Best Film, 2014, 'Hard Time Bus'
 18th Annual American Black Film Festival, 2014, Best Actor nominee, 'Hard Time Bus'

References

External links 

Living people
English male television actors
English male film actors
English male child actors
English people of Jamaican descent
People from Birmingham, West Midlands
Year of birth missing (living people)